The Kronsee is a lake in the Holstein Switzerland region of North Germany.
It lies on the River Schwentine between the Kleiner Plöner See, upstream, and
the Fuhlensee, downstream, south of Wahlstorf Manor House.

 

Lakes of Schleswig-Holstein
LKronsee